Tetramorium caespitum, also known as the pavement ant, is a species of ant in the family Formicidae.

References

Tetramorium
Ants described in 1758
Taxa named by Carl Linnaeus